Wienerwald GmbH is a German chain of franchised fast food restaurants, specializing in chicken – especially hendl (a type of roast chicken), schnitzel, and other similar products. The name means Vienna Woods.

As of 2022 there are five Wienerwald restaurants in Germany and three in Egypt. Previously, the company had also operated in Austria, Belgium, Hungary, Romania, Turkey, the United Arab Emirates and the United States.

History
Founded in 1955 by Linz restaurateur Friedrich Jahn (1923 – 1998) in Munich, Wienerwald rapidly grew to become Europe's largest restaurant chain with more than 1600 restaurants in 1978.

In 1978, Wienerwald purchased the 273-restaurant Lum's chain from the former owner of Kentucky Fried Chicken, John Y. Brown Jr. The chain's inability to market its outlets as providers of chicken (rather than overcoming the US misconception that "Wienerwald" was a wiener chain), plus the huge growth in 1978 brought enormous debts. Many of the restaurants in the US and Europe had to close, and Wienerwald declared bankruptcy in 1982, divesting itself of its 880 restaurants in the United States.

The chain recovered, but failed to return to its former glory; sales and restaurant numbers declined and many foreign markets were abandoned. In 2003, and again in 2007, Wienerwald filed for bankruptcy again, which resulted in further closures of restaurants and further release of employees.

In 2007, Friedrich Jahn's daughters Margot Steinberg and Evelyn Peitzner purchased the company and Wienerwald started a new era. In order to become competitive again, the chain modernized and adjusted its concept, shifting from casual dining more towards fast food – with orders placed and picked up at the counter instead of the customer being served at the table – and also upgrading the interior design. In June 2009 the first Wienerwald in Turkey opened in Istanbul, but despite a rapid expansion—temporarily reaching 30 branches—the market has been abandoned. The first Romanian restaurant in Bucharest opened in April 2011, but subsequently the company withdrew from Romania as well. , 23 restaurants remained in Germany (sited most densely in Bavaria), three in Greater Cairo and one each in Budapest and in Dubai.

Wienerwald Restaurants GmbH (Austria)
In Austria, Friedrich Jahn sold all Wienerwald restaurants to a different owner in 1986, thus separating the Austrian restaurants from the rest of the company. Today, detached spin out company Wienerwald Restaurants GmbH operates eight casual dining restaurants with a similar menu.

See also

 List of fast-food chicken restaurants

References

External links
 Wienerwald - Official web presence 
 Wienerwald - Egyptian entity's English-language site

1955 establishments in West Germany
Food and drink companies based in Munich
Fast-food chains of Germany
Fast-food franchises
Fast-food poultry restaurants
Restaurants established in 1955
Companies that filed for Chapter 11 bankruptcy in 1982
Companies that have filed for Chapter 7 bankruptcy
Companies based in Lower Saxony